Davide Buglio (born 5 February 1998) is an Italian footballer who plays as a midfielder for  side Siena.

Club career
Buglio started his career in Inter, he was loaned to Empoli, before he was finally sold. He never played a senior match in Empoli, the team won the 2017–18 Serie B. On the summer of 2018, Serie C side Arezzo signed him. He made his professional debut in the first round of 2018–19 Serie C, on 16 September 2018 against Lucchese, coming in as a substitute for Lorenzo Tassi in the 80th minute, he scored the only goal of the match 5 minutes later.

On 29 August 2019, he joined Padova. On 1 February 2021, he moved on loan to Livorno.

On 30 August 2021, Buglio was loaned to Monterosi.

References

External links
 
 
 

1998 births
Living people
People from Pietrasanta
Footballers from Tuscany
Italian footballers
Association football midfielders
Serie C players
Empoli F.C. players
S.S. Arezzo players
Calcio Padova players
U.S. Livorno 1915 players
Monterosi Tuscia F.C. players
A.C.N. Siena 1904 players
Sportspeople from the Province of Lucca